Air Vice-Marshal Richard Ernest Saul,  (16 April 1891 – 30 November 1965) was a pilot during the First World War and a senior Royal Air Force commander during the Second World War.

Earlier years 
Saul was born in Dublin, Ireland, in 1891. He was a bank official with the Royal Bank of Ireland before joining the Army.§ At the start of the First World War he was a second lieutenant in the Royal Army Service Corps but by 1916 he was a Flying Officer (Observer) with No. 16 Squadron of the Army's Royal Flying Corps. During the war he rose to command No. 4 Squadron and after the armistice he commanded No. 7 Squadron and then No. 12 Squadron. In 1925 he was given command of No. 2 Squadron. A keen sportsman Saul played rugby and hockey for the RAF; in both 1928 and 1932 he was the RAF tennis champion.

In September 1933 Saul was appointed the Officer Commanding No. 203 Squadron operating out of Basra in Iraq and in 1935 Saul led a flight of flying boats, from his squadron, on a long-distance journey from Plymouth to Basra.

Second World War and beyond
During the Second World War Saul was Air Officer Commanding No. 13 Group from 1939, Air Officer Commanding No. 12 Group from 1940 and then Air Officer Commanding Air Defences Eastern Mediterranean from 1943.

Saul retired from the RAF on 29 June 1944 and then served as the Chairman of the United Nations Relief and Rehabilitation Administration's mission in the Balkans. He next acted as the vice-chairman of the International Transport Commission in Rome. After Saul left Rome in 1951, he took up employment as the manager of the University of Toronto bookshop until finally retiring in 1959. Richard Saul died on 30 November 1965 after being hit by a car two days earlier.

Notes

References
Century of Flight – Air Vice Marshal Richard Ernest Saul D.F.C.
The Kenton Bar Bunker – Air Vice Marshal Richard Saul
Valka.cz – Air Vice Marshal Richard Saul 

|-

|-

|-

|-

|-

|-

1891 births
1965 deaths
British World War I fighter pilots
Royal Flying Corps officers
British Army personnel of World War I
Royal Air Force personnel of World War I
Royal Air Force air marshals of World War II
Battle of Britain
Aviators from Dublin (city)
Irish people of World War I
Irish people of World War II
Royal Army Service Corps officers
British officials of the United Nations
Companions of the Order of the Bath
Recipients of the Distinguished Flying Cross (United Kingdom)
Knights of the Order of the Crown (Belgium)
Recipients of the Croix de guerre (Belgium)
British male tennis players
Military personnel from Dublin (city)